50 Kennedy Plaza (formerly known as Fleet Center) is a postmodern skyscraper in Providence, Rhode Island. The building is named for Kennedy Plaza, which stands to the structure's northeast.

Built by Gilbane Building Company, notable occupants with headquarters in the building include Fortune 1000 company Nortek, Inc. and private equity firm Providence Equity Partners.

The building's exterior façade features in "granite framing green-reflective-glass side elevations". Its location, sandwiched between the  One Financial Center and the  Industrial National Bank Building, ostensibly detracts from its height with architectural historian William Woodward calling it, "a trifle too low for the site." In company of its two neighbors, however, the building forms part of one of the most identifiable parts of the Providence skyline. This section of the Providence skyline is featured on the animated television series Family Guy.

The building is accessible via 100 Westminster St., which has been owned by Paolino Properties since 2014.

Gallery

References 

HOK (firm) buildings
Office buildings completed in 1985
Skyscraper office buildings in Providence, Rhode Island
1985 establishments in Rhode Island